Sepoy Maqbool Hussain (c. 1940 — 28 August 2018) was a Pakistani soldier who was well known for his capture and brutal imprisonment for four decades in Indian military jails when he was wounded during the Indo-Pakistani War of 1965 and subsequently taken prisoner by Indian troops.

Capture in 1965 & subsequent torture 
Following Hussain's capture during the war, the Indians did not register his legal status as a prisoner of war (POW), stripping him of certain rights that he would otherwise be entitled to by international law. While in the custody of Indian forces, Hussain was notoriously subjected to severe torture by interrogators and remained defiant when he was demanded to give up any information he knew to jeopardize Pakistan's security. He was regularly harassed by his captors and put under pressure to insult his nation with various phrases such as "Pākistān Murdābād" ( – lit: "Death to Pakistan"), to which he was known to actively respond with "Pākistān Zindābād" ( – lit: "Long Live Pakistan"). His persistent refusal to oblige with his Indian captors angered them, and they proceeded to cut out Hussain's tongue and rip his fingernails off.

Return to Pakistan 
He was released on 17 September 2005 during a prisoner exchange between India and Pakistan at the Wagah-Attari border crossing. Upon his return to Pakistan, Hussain had no family left to go to, and his mental and physical state had reduced to the point where he would only respond with his rank and military service number whenever he was asked any questions by passersby. Hussain managed to find his way to a Pakistan Army garrison in Azad Kashmir and repeatedly wrote down his rank and service number on a piece of paper. After much inquiry, Hussain's service in the Indo-Pakistani War of 1965 was discovered and full accommodations began to be made by the military for him.

Awards 
On 23 March 2009, Sepoy Maqbool Hussain of the Azad Kashmir Regiment was awarded the Sitara-e-Jurat for his gallantry during the war.

Death 
Hussain died on August 28, 2018 in the city of Attock, Punjab. He was a native of Tarar Khel, Sudhanoti District in Kashmir.

In popular culture
The Pakistan Armed Forces' media wing, the ISPR and Interflow Communications Limited co-produced a drama series named Sipahi Maqbool Hussain that aired during the month of April 2008.

References

External links
COAS Kayani paying tribute to Maqbool Hussain
Fair & Square: To Sepoy Maqbool Hussain with loveb y Mian Saifur Rehman

1940s births
2018 deaths
Pakistani people imprisoned abroad
Recipients of Sitara-e-Jurat
People from Sudhanoti District
Military personnel of the Indo-Pakistani War of 1965
Year of birth missing
20th-century Pakistani military personnel
Pakistani prisoners of war